Amphixystis paraglypta is a species of moth in the family Tineidae first described by Edward Meyrick in 1889. It is endemic to New Zealand.

References

Moths described in 1889
Tineidae
Moths of New Zealand
Endemic fauna of New Zealand
Taxa named by Edward Meyrick
Endemic moths of New Zealand